Pandoflabella strigidiscalis is a species of snout moth in the genus Pandoflabella. It is found in Central America.

References

Moths described in 1916
Epipaschiinae